Procambarus cometes, the Mississippi flatwoods crayfish is a species of crayfish in the family Cambaridae. It is endemic to Lowndes County and Oktibbeha County, Mississippi, and is listed as an endangered species on the IUCN Red List.

References

Cambaridae
Endemic fauna of the United States
Freshwater crustaceans of North America
Taxonomy articles created by Polbot
Crustaceans described in 1978
Taxa named by Joseph F. Fitzpatrick Jr.